Kurasawatrechus is a genus of beetles in the family Carabidae, containing the following species:

 Kurasawatrechus aberrans Ueno, 1978
 Kurasawatrechus agiensis Ueno, 1975
 Kurasawatrechus brevicornis Ueno, 1979
 Kurasawatrechus chinchiro Ueno, 1974
 Kurasawatrechus endogaeus Ueno & Baba, 1965
 Kurasawatrechus eriophorus Yoshida & Nomura, 1952
 Kurasawatrechus fujisanus Ueno, 1971
 Kurasawatrechus glabratus Ueno & Namkung, 1968
 Kurasawatrechus glabriventris Ueno, 1974
 Kurasawatrechus grandis Ueno, 1973
 Kurasawatrechus gujoensis Ueno, 1974
 Kurasawatrechus hirakei Ueno, 1979
 Kurasawatrechus ichihashii Ueno, 1959
 Kurasawatrechus intermedius Ueno, 1988
 Kurasawatrechus katoi Ueno, 1959
 Kurasawatrechus kawaguchii Ueno, 1973
 Kurasawatrechus kyokoae Ueno & Baba, 1974
 Kurasawatrechus latior Ueno & Namkung, 1968
 Kurasawatrechus longipes Ueno & Namkung, 1968
 Kurasawatrechus longulus Ueno, 1973
 Kurasawatrechus matsuii Ueno, 1999
 Kurasawatrechus moritai Ueno, 1979
 Kurasawatrechus nishikawai Ueno, 1993
 Kurasawatrechus notsuii Ueno, 1983
 Kurasawatrechus ohkawai Ueno, 1988
 Kurasawatrechus ohshimai Ueno, 1952
 Kurasawatrechus quadraticollis Ueno, 1974
 Kurasawatrechus ryugashiensis Ueno, 1988
 Kurasawatrechus setiger Ueno & Namkung, 1968
 Kurasawatrechus sonei Ueno, 1992
 Kurasawatrechus spelaeus Ueno, 1958
 Kurasawatrechus tanakai Ueno, 1974
 Kurasawatrechus torigaii Ueno, 1973
 Kurasawatrechus yadai Ueno & Kitayama, 2005
 Kurasawatrechus yamizonis Ueno, 1988
 Kurasawatrechus zenbai Ueno, 1990

References

Trechinae